Despite its short history, the Nepali movie industry has its own place in the cultural heritage of Nepal, it's sometimes unofficially called Kollywood. Most Kollywood films are narrative, and are shot on 16-millimeter film.

The first Nepali-language film was Satya Harischandra, which was released in 1951 in Darjeeling, India, and produced by D. B. Pariyar. The first Nepali-language movie made in Nepal was Aama, which was released in 1964 produced by the Nepalese government. However, the first Nepali-language movie made by the Nepalese private sector was Maitighar, which starred Mala Sinha and was released in 1966. The first color Nepali-language movie was Kumari.  Nepal First Indigenous Santali language Feature Film was Bonodal (Change) 2016 made for the socio-cultural civilization and religious interests of Santali community. This film is designed by keeping a close views on many meaningful facts. The Script, editor, produced and directed by Kiran Khatiwada. Nepalese ex- mp Mr. Mohan Tudu also shows his acting skilled in the film and the film was inaugurated by ex- former minister of communication information Mr. Surendra Kumar Karki.

Early cinema (1951–1979)

1980s

1990s

2000s

2010s

2010

2011

2012

2013

2014

2015

2016

2016

2018

2019

2020

See also
 List of foreign films shot in Nepal
 List of Nepal Bhasa films

References 

 Nepali Movies